Deivapiravi is a 1960 Indian Tamil-language film, directed by Krishnan–Panju. The film stars Sivaji Ganesan, Padmini, S. S. Rajendran, K. A. Thangavelu and M. N. Rajam. The film was dubbed and released in Telugu as Anumanam and released on 24 June 1961. At the 8th National Film Awards, the film won the All India Certificate of Merit for the Third Best Feature Film. It was remade the same year in Hindi as Bindya, and in 1965 in Sinhala as Sekaya.

Plot 
Madhavan is a well-to-do businessman and respectable bigwig in the society. He has a brother Manohar. Madhavan gets married to Thangam and her brother, Ramu, comes to live with them getting educated with the help of Madhavan. Unlike Manohar who turns out to be good-for-nothing, Ramu works hard earning the respect of Madhavan. Ramu and Manohar, both are in love with Thilagam while Thilagam prefers Ramu. Seeing this as a betrayal, Thangam convinces Ramu to give up Thilagam for Manohar.

Unknown to the rest of them, Nandhini is Madhavan's step sister. He decides to help her by asking her to live with them. She starts to manipulate the household by raking in controversies between Ramu and Manohar, Madhavan and Thangam by insinuating an affair between her and Nair while making it look like she is having an affair with Madhavan subtly there by aiming to take over the family's wealth.

In the end, Ramu clears the air by forcing an open confrontation where everyone speaks out their mind thereby coming out clean about their individual relationships. Madhavan confesses that Nandhini is his sister while Thangam says that she and Nair too treated each other as sibilings. Ramu make it clear to Manohar that he will not marry Thilagam. Seeing her plot break open, Nandhini runs away with family gold only to be caught by Nair and Manohar. Thangam, however, decides to give off the family jewels to her so that she can get married and have a normal life.

Cast 
Sivaji Ganesan as Madhavan
Padmini as Thangam
S. S. Rajendran as Ramu
K. A. Thangavelu
M. N. Rajam as Thilagam
M. S. Sundari Bai
Tambaram Lalitha as Nandhini
M. Saroja as Arundhathi
Kallapart Natarajan as Manohar
K. Sarangapani as Saminatha Pillai
A. Karunanidhi as Nair
Radhabhai as Thangam and Ramu's mother
P. S. Gnanam
K. S. Angamuthu
 S. Rama Rao

Production 
Deivapiravi was written by K. S. Gopalakrishnan. A writer accused him of story theft and Gopalakrishnan was taken to court, but was exonerated after his story was found to be original.

Soundtrack 
The music was composed by R. Sudarsanam. The lyrics were written by Thanjai N. Ramaiah Dass, Udumalai Narayana Kavi, Kavi Rajagopal and K. S. Gopalakrishnan.

Release and reception 
Deivapiravi was released on 13 April 1960. The Indian Express praised the performances of the lead actors, and called Thangavelu's comedy a major attraction. The film was a success, running for over 100 days in theatres.

Remakes 
Before AVM remade Deivapiravi in Hindi as Bindya in the same year, Ganesan advised them not to remake the film as he felt it would not come well. However AVM ignored him and went on to make the film in Hindi. Bindya was a failure and many years later, Saravanan expressed regret for ignoring Ganesan's advice. The film was later remade in Sinhala as Sekaya in 1965.

References

External links 
 

1960 films
1960s Tamil-language films
AVM Productions films
Films directed by Krishnan–Panju
Films involved in plagiarism controversies
Films scored by R. Sudarsanam
Films with screenplays by K. S. Gopalakrishnan
Tamil films remade in other languages
Third Best Feature Film National Film Award winners